The 1979–80 Hellenic Football League season was the 27th in the history of the Hellenic Football League, a football competition in England.

Premier Division

The Premier Division featured twelve clubs which competed in the division last season, along with four new clubs.
Clubs promoted from Division One:
Kidlington
Morris Motors
Northwood
Plus:
Worrall Hill, joined from the Gloucestershire County League

League table

Division One

The Division One featured 14 clubs which competed in the division last season, along with 2 new clubs:
Milton Keynes Borough, transferred from the United Counties League
A.F.C. Aldermaston, joined from the Reading & District League

League table

References

External links
 Hellenic Football League

1979-80
8